Osoyoos Lake is a lake located in British Columbia, Canada, and Washington state of the United States. Osoyoos is derived from the word sẁiẁs meaning "narrowing of the waters" in the local Okanagan language (Syilx'tsn).

Located on the lakeshore are the town of Osoyoos, British Columbia and city of Oroville, Washington. Oroville's Osoyoos Lake State Park is located on its shore.

Hydrology
Osoyoos Lake and its outlet and primary inflow, the Okanogan River (spelled in Canada as the Okanagan River), are subject to international water-sharing agreements governed by the International Joint Commission as part of the Columbia Basin. The authority responsible for overseeing the IJC agreements is the International Osoyoos Lake Board of Control, composed of appointees from Environment Canada, the BC Ministry of Water, Land Air Protection, the US Army Corps of Engineers, the US Geological Survey, and private consultants.

Gallery

See also

 Zosel Dam

References

Lakes of the Okanagan
Lakes of Washington (state)
Lakes of Okanogan County, Washington
Regional District of Okanagan-Similkameen
Canada–United States border
International lakes of North America
Washington placenames of Native American origin